Batya Weinbaum (born Betty Susan Weinbaum in 1952) is an American poet, feminist, artist, editor, and professor. She founded Femspec Journal, and has published 17 books, over 500 articles, essays, poems, reviews, and pieces of short fiction in various publications.

Biography 
Weinbaum was born February 2, 1952, in Ann Arbor, Michigan and spent her childhood in Terre Haute, Indiana. Her parents, Barbara Adele Hyman and Jack Gerald Weinbaum, were active in the civil rights movement and the presidential campaigns of John F. Kennedy. Weinbaum participated in the 1971 May Day protests in Washington, D.C., during which over 7,000 people were arrested.

In the late 1970s, Weinbaum voiced feminist views in several articles published in political journals. These included "The Other Side of the Paycheck: Monopoly Capital and the Structure of Consumption," co-authored with Amy Bridges in Monthly Review, "Women in the Transition to Socialism: Perspectives on the Chinese Case," in Review of Radical Political Economics, 1976  and "Redefining the Question of Revolution," in Review of Radical Political Economics, 1977. 

In 1984, Weinbaum briefly stayed at a commune known as Twin Oaks. Her essay on this experience became a chapter in Rudy Rohrlich and Elaine Hoffman Baruch's book, Women in Search of Utopia: Mavericks and Mythmakers In the early and mid-80s, she attended the Michigan Women's Music Festival and worked on the crew. She wrote the proposal that founded the alternative healing space, Oasis, with Kristi Vogel as a result of activism of alternative healers. 

From 1984 to 1986, Weinbaum met and taught courses with Dr. Liz Kennedy at SUNY Buffalo. Her association with Kennedy helped decide Weinbaum's multicultural approach to her academic direction.

In 1997, Weinbaum founded a feminist journal, Femspec, an interdisciplinary journal dedicated to science fiction, fantasy, magic realism, surrealism, myth, folklore and other supernatural genres and continued as editor-in-chief. 2013-2020, she had been operating a feminist art installation project on Isla Mujeres, Mexico. 

In 2014, she bought land in Floyd, Virginia where she developed a feminist educational retreat.

After working in Carpinteria at the Pacifica Graduate Institute she wrote a column on transformational palmistry for the Santa Barbara Independent and subsequently published two books based on this column called Opening Palms, and On the Palmist's Road.

Academic career 
From 1998 to 2003 at Cleveland State University, Weinbaum taught courses in multicultural literature including other genres, such as theater, poetry and performance art, as well as courses on Shakespeare and Classics. From 2003 to 2007, Weinbaum taught as a peripatetic educator teaching speech and debate and organizing literary events, Beat cafes and Victorian parlors in Cleveland Heights, Ohio. She was also a visiting faculty and curriculum adviser at Pacifica Graduate Institute from 2006 to 2007. This led to a teaching career based on distance learning with a variety of institutions including Gaia University, Ivy Bridge College of Tiffin University, State University of New York's Empire State College Center for Distance Learning and currently the American Public University, American Public University, and Life University. In 2019, Weinbaum was invited to teach Women and Gender Studies at Virginia Polytechnic Institute and State University.

Her work is archived at National Archives of the National Historical Records and Publications Commission, American Women Making History and Culture: 1963-1982 Collection; Yale University Divinity School Library; Sallie Bingham Center for Women's History and Culture, Duke University's Rubenstein Library, Durham, NC; Isha l Isha, Haifa, Israel; University of Colorado, Fort Collins, CO; Mazur, LA; Pacifica Radio Archives, Bay Area, CA; Sexual Minorities Archives, Holyoke, MA; Lesbian Herstory Archives, Brooklyn, NY; News and Public Affairs Archives: Alternative Independent Radio News Programming; Kalvos Damion Broadcast Audio Archive; The Michael Schwartz Library, Cleveland State University.

Publications

Books 
 Curious Courtship of Women's Liberation and Socialism, South End Press, 1978, 
 Island of Floating Women, Clothespin Fever Press, 1994, 
 Islands of Women and Amazons: Representations and Realities, University of Texas Press, 2000, 
 Nightmares of Sasha Weitzwoman, Femspec Books, 2010, 
 Pictures of Patriarchy, South End Press, 1999, 

 Islands of Women and Amazons: Representations and Realities. Second Edition. 2017

 Feminist Voices. Seattle: Aqueduct. 2013

 This Could Happen to You: Post 9-11 Memoir. Femspec Books. 2012
 El Curioso Noviazgo Entre Feminismo y Socialismo. Madrid: Siglo XXI. 1983

Edited journal issues 

 1998–present. Femspec, Vol.1.1-22.2. 23.1 is in production.

Edited books 

 Mercer, Naomi, Toward Utopia: Feminist Dystopian Writing and Religious Fundamentalism in Margaret Atwood's The Handmaid's Tale, Louise Marley's The Terrorists of Irustan, and Marge Piercy's He, She and It, Femspec Books and Productions, 2015

 IX Chel Press, Issues 1–3, Isla Mujeres

Other writings 
According to Gale Contemporary Authors (2009) additional books and other writings have included:
 Searching for Peace on Hostile Grounds: Interviewing Grassroots Women in Israel, 1989-1999 (2003)

 Sasha's Harlem (novel; part one of trilogy), Pyx Press 2004.

 Jerusalem Romance, East Coast Editions (Longmeadow, NY), 1993.

 Fragments of Motherhood (includes prose), Angel Fish Press (East Montpelier, VT), 1996

 Mexico in Motion: Actions and Images, Angel Fish Press, 1997

Poetry 
Weinbaum has contributed poetry to periodicals and various anthologies, including Meydele, What She Wants, Buffalo Mountain, Mother-tongues, Birth Passages, Flower, Counterpoint, Catharsis, Old Crow, Town Crier, Spectrum, Mountain Laurel, Feminist Review, Key West Review, and Heresies, and a contributor of articles, stories, and reviews to periodicals, including Spectrum, Rain and Thunder, Trivia, Goddess Alive, Maize, Journal of Progressive Judaism, Extrapolation, Foundation, Frontiers, Multicultural Education, What She Wants, Science-Fiction Studies, Signs, Magic Realism, MELUS, Quill, Phoenix Rising, Anything That Moves, Journal of Feminist Therapy, Kibbutz Trends, Peace Review, Off Our Backs, Popular Photography, World, Second Wave, Iowa Woman, Midwivery Connection, Common Woman, NWSA Journal, Counterpoint, and Women's Studies International Forum.

Critical reception 
Choice reviewer S. A. Inness praised Islands of Women and Amazons: Representations and Realities as "especially comprehensive" and found Weinbaum's approach to be "engaging and carefully researched." Utopian Studies contributor Linda L. Kick added, "While Weinbaum admits to having explored only a portion of available literature and cultural practices, readers of her book will be amazed by, and grateful for, the breadth and promise of her interdisciplinary scholarship."

Biographical and critical sources 
Choice, July 2000, S. A. Inness, review of Islands of Women and Amazons: Representations and Realities, p. 223.

Cleveland Plain Dealer, October 8, 2000, Zina Vishnevsky, "Seeking Zena's Sisters in Legend of Amazons."

Journal of Research on Mothering, spring, 2002, Gail M. Lindsay, review of Islands of Women and Amazons.

Lambda Book Report, January–February 1994, Judith Katz, review of The Island of Floating Women, p. 36.

Off Our Backs, August–September 1979, interview with Weinbaum, p. 22; October 2000, Carol Anne Douglas, review of Islands of Women and Amazons, p. 16.

Utopian Studies Journal, Volume 11, number 2, 2000, Linda L. Kick, review of Islands of Women and Amazons, pp. 305–307.

Women and Politics, Volume 2, numbers 1–2, Annette M. Bickel, review of The Curious Courtship of Women's Liberation and Socialism, p. 145

References 

1952 births
American feminist writers
Postmodern feminists
Postmodern writers
Jewish American writers
Jewish feminists
Living people
21st-century American Jews